"Gobe" (Yoruba: "Trouble") is a song by Nigerian singer Davido, released on February 25, 2013. It peaked at number 1 on MTV Base's Official Naija Top Ten chart, surpassing Banky W.'s "Yes/No". The song stayed at the top of the music chart for three weeks and was eventually toppled by Kcee's "Limpopo". "Gobe" was nominated for Most Popular Song of the Year at the 2013 City People Entertainment Awards and for Best Pop Single at The Headies 2013. The music video for "Gobe" was nominated for Most Gifted Afro Pop Video at the 2013 Channel O Music Video Awards, and for Best Pop Extra Video at the 2013 Nigeria Music Video Awards (NMVA). Furthermore, it was nominated for Best African Act Video at the 2013 4Syte TV Music Video Awards.

Gobe controversy
There were speculations surrounding the release of "Gobe". An impersonator of Password created a Twitter account two days after the song's release and accused Davido of theft. Davido and Password both debunked the rumor by posting several tweets. In an interview with Sunday Beats, Kamal Ajiboye said Davido bought the song from Password for ₦350,000. He specifically said, "Password is a friend to our producer, Shizzi. He told Shizzi he had a song and Shizzi asked him to bring it. Shizzi told Davido to listen to the song and if he liked it, he could turn the song around. When Davido heard the song, he liked it. He removed something and added his own stuff to it. The guy never said the song had been released. If he did, we wouldn’t have used the song. Maybe because the song did not do well, that was why he brought it to us. We paid him N350,000 for the song."

Music video
An accompanying music video for "Gobe" was also released on February 25, 2013, at a total length of 4 minutes and 6 seconds. It has surpassed 8 million views on YouTube.

Critical reception
"Gobe" was met with positive reviews. Charles Mgbolu of Vanguard described it as a song that "exudes fun from start to finish."

Accolades

Track listing and remixes

Release history

References

2013 singles
2013 songs
Davido songs
Song recordings produced by Shizzi
Yoruba-language songs
Songs written by Davido